Love (German: Liebe) is a 1919 German silent film directed by Manfred Noa and starring Reinhold Schünzel and Tzwetta Tzatschewa.

The film's sets were designed by the art director Karl Machus.

Cast
 Reinhold Schünzel as Herbert Warfield 
 Tzwetta Tzatschewa as Dorothy Hall 
 Jeanette Bethge as Garderobiere 
 Bruno Harprecht as James Illing 
 Karl Platen as Erster Sekretär bei Illing 
 Fritz Richard as Flüchtling Alvadres 
 Heinz Sarnow as Robert

References

Bibliography
 Bock, Hans-Michael & Bergfelder, Tim. The Concise CineGraph. Encyclopedia of German Cinema. Berghahn Books, 2009.

External links

1919 films
Films of the Weimar Republic
German silent feature films
Films directed by Manfred Noa
German black-and-white films
1910s German films
Films shot at Terra Studios